The Eighth Avenue station is a local station on the BMT Sea Beach Line of the New York City Subway. It is located in Sunset Park, Brooklyn, at the intersection of Eighth Avenue and 62nd Street. It is served by the N train at all times. During rush hours, several W and northbound Q trains also serve the station.

Eighth Avenue is the northernmost stop on the Sea Beach Line. West of this station, the tracks curve northward, enter a tunnel, and become the express tracks of the BMT Fourth Avenue Line.

The station serves the Sunset Park Chinatown, the oldest Chinatown in Brooklyn, which is centered around Eighth Avenue.

Station layout

This open-cut station opened on June 22, 1915. It has four tracks and two side platforms, but the two center express tracks are not normally used. The Coney Island-bound track has been disconnected from the line and the Manhattan-bound track is signaled for trains in both directions. Both platforms have beige concrete fences in the lower half and green metal windscreens in the upper half. Brown canopies with green support columns and frames run along the entire length and the station signs are at the standard black name plate in white Helvetica lettering.

The LIRR Bay Ridge Branch crosses underneath and is visible from the north end of the station.

This is the northernmost station on the Sea Beach Line. North of here, the Coney Island-bound express track dead ends while the Manhattan-bound express track merges with the local tracks as the line curves north and enters the tunnel into the BMT Fourth Avenue Line.

This station, along with eight others along the Sea Beach Line, was renovated from 2016 to 2019, which included installation of two ADA-accessible elevators (original plans were to construct two wheelchair ramps to each platform). The Manhattan-bound platform was closed from January 18, 2016 to May 22, 2017 and a temporary platform was set up on the Coney Island express track for Manhattan-bound service. The Coney Island-bound platform was closed for a much longer period of time, from July 31, 2017 to July 1, 2019. During this time, southbound trains used the northbound express track and the temporary platform.

A project to make the station ADA-accessible was originally expected to be completed in December 2018, but was repeatedly delayed. An elevator to the northbound platform opened on November 4, 2019. Another elevator to the southbound platform was planned to be opened in May 2020. , the southbound elevator still had not been completed, but funding had been committed to completing the elevator. In December 2021, the MTA awarded a contract for the installation of elevators at eight stations, including the Eighth Avenue station's southbound platform. , the project is scheduled to be completed in April 2023.

Exits

The station has an entrance at the extreme east end, which is a beige street-level station house on the Eighth Avenue overpass at 62nd Street above the platforms and tracks. A single staircase from each platform goes up to a crossover, where a set of doors lead to the waiting area above the station house. A turnstile bank leads to the token booth and exit doors.

The station also has an entrance at the extreme west end, with two staircases from each platform leading up to Seventh Avenue and 62nd Street. In the past, it was closed due to high crime and repurposed into a maintenance shop. The staircases and overpass above the tracks remained intact, and the entrances were reopened in February 2019 as part of the reconstruction of this station.

Notes

References

External links 

 
 Station Reporter — N train
 The Subway Nut — 8th Avenue Pictures
 Eighth Avenue entrance from Google Maps Street View
 Seventh Avenue entrance from Google Maps Street View
Uptown & Temporary Platforms from Google Maps Street View

BMT Sea Beach Line stations
New York City Subway stations in Brooklyn
Railway stations in the United States opened in 1915
1915 establishments in New York City
Sunset Park, Brooklyn